The 2015 Arkansas Razorbacks football team represented the University of Arkansas during the 2015 NCAA Division I FBS football season. The Razorbacks played their home games at Donald W. Reynolds Razorback Stadium in Fayetteville and War Memorial Stadium in Little Rock. They competed as a member of the Western Division of the Southeastern Conference.  Arkansas was led by third-year head coach Bret Bielema. Dan Enos served his first season as offensive coordinator, replacing Jim Chaney who left for a job with Pittsburgh. Enos was previously the head coach of Central Michigan.

Personnel

Coaching staff

Background

In the second season under head coach Bret Bielema, the Razorbacks went to a bowl game and had a winning record for the first time since 2011, which was the last season of former head coach Bobby Petrino.

Arkansas won three of its last four games, including becoming the first team in NCAA Division I history to shut out consecutive ranked opponents (LSU, Ole Miss) as an unranked team.

They ended the year by routing rival Texas in the 2014 Texas Bowl, 31–7.

Recap

Arkansas lost leading returning rusher Jonathan Williams before the season to a foot injury, tempering expectations slightly, but the #18 ranked Razorbacks cruised to a 48-13 victory over UTEP in the season opener.

The next three weeks, however, were full of disappointment. First, the Razorbacks lost to Toledo, a 23-point underdog, in Little Rock's War Memorial Stadium, 16-12, and then turned around and lost to Texas Tech in Fayetteville, 35-24. A week later, Texas A&M defeated the Razorbacks in overtime for the second consecutive year, 28-21, to begin SEC play.

Bielema got his first SEC road win to begin October, defeating the Tennessee Volunteers 24-20 in Neyland Stadium. After dropping one on the road to eventual SEC champion Alabama on October 10, the Razorbacks would not lose again until November 21.

That included a four-overtime win at home over Auburn, a wild overtime victory over then #19 Ole Miss on the road which saw the Razorbacks convert a 4th-and-25 in overtime via a lateral from tight end Hunter Henry, and a 31-14 dismantling of then #9 LSU.

Despite losing a shootout to Mississippi State in Fayetteville, Arkansas bounced back with a 28-3 victory in the regular season finale over Missouri in Gary Pinkel's final game coaching the Tigers.

Arkansas accepted an invitation to the Liberty Bowl to play Kansas State on Jan. 2. Thanks to three touchdowns and 185 yards from running back Alex Collins, the Razorbacks defeated the Wildcats, 45-23. It was the first time Arkansas had won back-to-back bowl games in consecutive seasons in program history, and the 45 points was the most ever in a bowl game. The Razorbacks have won each of their last three bowl games, counting back to the 2012 Cotton Bowl.

The seven regular season wins, including five in SEC play, were the most for Arkansas since Bobby Petrino's final season in 2011. That season also ended with a bowl game victory against Kansas State.

Tight end Hunter Henry and offensive guard Sebastian Tretola were named first team All-SEC. Henry was also a consensus first team All-American, and won the John Mackey Award given to the nation's best tight end. Tretola was named an All-American as well. Quarterback Brandon Allen, Collins, and offensive tackle Dan Skipper were named second team All-SEC. Freshman linebacker Dre Greenlaw was named to the SEC All-Freshman Team, as well as the Freshman All-American Team.

Collins was named the Liberty Bowl MVP. Collins would finish the season with 1,577 yards rushing, good enough for third place in the Arkansas all-time single season record book. Collins' 20 rushing touchdowns in 2015 ranks first for the Hogs program. Collins elected to leave early for the NFL draft, finishing his college career with 3,703 yards, which is second in school history behind only Darren McFadden, and 36 rushing touchdowns. He also became only the third player in school history to rush for 1,000 yards in three consecutive seasons, joining McFadden (2005-2007) and Ben Cowins (1976-1978), as well as joining McFadden and Herschel Walker as the only running backs in SEC history to have 1,000 yard seasons in their first three years playing college football.

Schedule

Schedule Source:

Game summaries

UTEP

Toledo

Texas Tech

vs. No. 14 Texas A&M

at Tennessee

at No. 8 Alabama

Auburn

UT Martin

at No. 19 Ole Miss

Rankings

References

Arkansas
Arkansas Razorbacks football
Liberty Bowl champion seasons
Arkansas Razorbacks football